Akkineni Ramesh Prasad (born Akkineni Ramesh Prasada Rao) is an Indian businessman, film producer, chairman and Head of Prasad Studios, Prasads IMAX and L V Prasad Eye Institute founded by his father L. V. Prasad. Prasad has served as the president of Film Federation of India during 1988–89 and a true legend who is down to earth, soft spoken and controversy less. Cinema world honoured him as 'Father of Modern Telugu Cinema' for his heavy cotributions for Telugu film industry. He brough latest technical equipment which led to improvisation in Picture quality, VFX, Sound design and more.

He obtained his B.E.M.S degree from United States, and established Prasad Film Labs in Chennai in 1974. Prasad Studios is the largest chain of Indian film post production facilities, with a total of 12 delivery units located in all the major film production centers of India namely Mumbai, Chennai, Hyderabad, Bangalore, Thiruvananthapuram, Bhuvaneswar, Kolkata and overseas presence in Singapore, Dubai and United States.

Prasad Group
Prasad Productions Pvt Ltd, 
Prasad Film Labs, 
Prasad EFX, 
Prasad Video Digital, 
L.V.Prasad Film and TV Academy, 
Prasads Multiplex/Mall Prasads IMAX
Prasad Panavision, 
DCE Dubai, 
DCE Singapore and 
Prasad Corp USA.

References

External links

Telugu film producers
Living people
Film producers from Andhra Pradesh
Year of birth missing (living people)